The Trichet-Draghi letter, also known as the letter of ECB to Italy, is a confidential correspondence by which, on 5 August 2011, the former and current ECB presidents Jean-Claude Trichet and Mario Draghi (outgoing Governor of the Bank of Italy) addressed to Italian government several requests in order to influence European support to drastic measures of economic rebalancing.

Background
Despite the approval of economical measures proposed by the Italian government (with Legge 30 luglio 2010, n. 122 and with Legge 15 luglio 2011 n. 111), on 4 August 2011 the spread of decennial btp-bund reached 389 points.

Historical context
On 5 August 2011, during dramatic crisis of European banks, the former governor of ECB, Jean Claude Trichet, together with Mario Draghi, wrote a "secret" letter to Italian government, at the time led by Silvio Berlusconi, in which they pushed for a series of economic measures "to be implemented as soon as possible". By complying of these measures, the support of ECB was implicitly conditioned by massive purchase of Italian bonds on the secondary market.

This initiative represented an absolute novelty and, for several commentators, a strong interference in the internal affairs of a sovereign country.

Requested measures
The letter specified the measures considered urgent in order to avoid the collapse of the country and of Euro. Listed points were:

1. Significant measures in order to increase the growth potential;
2. Immediate and decided measures to ensure the sustainability of public finances;
2.a Further measures of balance revision;
2.b Clause of automatic deficit reduction;
2.c Strict control about debt assumption, even commercial, and about expenses of regional and local authorities.

Publication of the letter
On 5 August 2011, the same day of the letter, with closed markets, Berlusconi and Tremonti summoned press conference to explain an extraordinary maneuver for Italy. After this conference, press began to talk about a "secret letter" of ECB sent to Italian government.

Andrea D'Ambra, president of Generazione attiva association, asked to ECB to see that letter, but on 7 September 2011 ECB answered that "the letter must remain secret":

On 29 September 2011, a scoop of Corriere della Sera reveals this letter to public opinion.

Consequences
The Italian government during August proposed further economical measures that Parliament approved in almost one month with Legge 14 settembre 2011 n. 148 (Conversione in legge, con modificazioni, del decreto-legge 13 agosto 2011, n. 138, recante ulteriori misure urgenti per la stabilizzazione finanziaria).

Nevertheless, in a political confrontation between Berlusconi, Angela Merkel and Nicolas Sarkozy on 22 October 2011, these measures were considered insufficient, in a meeting that was "defined in the following days as tense and extremely hard towards the government of Rome by Valentino Valentini, the personal adviser in international relationship of Italian Prime Minister. Merkel and Sarkozy, which evidently did not tolerate excuses about current difficult situation of Italy, pushed on Prime Minister, so that he announced strong and concrete measures, and to apply in order to demonstrate that his government is serious about debt problem."

Conspiracy theory

The illegal interceptions of NSA on collaborators of Italian Prime Minister were indicated by his party to stigmatize US interference and to find confirm of a conspiracy theory spread from these facts. According to this theory, the famous press conference of the following day (in which the leaders of Germany and France, before to answer to the question about their trust in Berlusconi and in the solidity of Italy, exchanged a wry smile, and then said to have trust in the sense of responsibility of Italian political, economical and financial institutions), had activated the President of Italian Republic Giorgio Napolitano who, on 26 October 2011, would have refused to sign a decree under preparation with further economical measures that would have reinforce the position of the Italian government facing the "perfect storm" of the financial market and the meeting EU in Nice.

The authors of this conspiracy theory do not exclude, but even better cumulate, other concurrent conspiratorial reconstructions in order to justify Berlusconi's resignation on 12 November 2011.

References

2011 in Italy
2011 documents
European Central Bank
Mario Draghi